Elections for the Iowa House of Representatives were held on November 8th, 2022. This was the first election for the Iowa House using the new legislative maps that were enacted following the 2020 census. Republicans expanded their majority in the chamber after a number of their members were defeated in primaries.

Background 
Jon Dunwell picked up the 29th district for the Republicans in a special election.

Retirements

Democrats
District 13: Chris Hall retired.
District 15: Charlie McConkey retired.
District 34: Bruce Hunter retired.
District 36: Marti Anderson retired.
District 41: Jo Oldson retired.
District 42: Kristin Sunde retired.
District 52: Todd Prichard retired.
District 60: Dave Williams retired.
District 62: Ras Smith retired.
District 65: Liz Bennett retired to run for state senator from District 39.
District 68: Molly Donahue retired to run for state senator from District 37.
District 69: Kirsten Running-Marquardt retired.
District 85: Christina Bohannan retired to run for U. S. representative from Iowa's 1st congressional district.
District 86: Mary Mascher retired.
District 90: Cindy Winckler retired to run for state senator from District 49.
District 98: Mary Wolfe retired.

Republicans
District 8: Terry Baxter retired.
District 11: Gary Worthan retired.
District 16: Brent Siegrist was disqualified from renomination.
District 22: Jon Jacobsen retired.
District 24: Cecil Dolecheck retired.
District 37: Mike Bousselot retired to run for state senator from District 21.
District 48: Robert Bacon retired.
District 63: Sandy Salmon retired to run for state senator from District 29.
District 78: Jarad Klein retired.
District 80: Holly Brink retired.
District 81: Cherielynn Westrich retired to run for state senator from District 13.
District 88: David Kerr retired.
District 92: Ross Paustian retired.
District 95: Charlie McClintock retired to run for state senator from District 42.

Incumbents defeated

In primaries

Republicans
District 5: Dennis Bush lost renomination to Zach Dieken.
District 37: Jon Thorup lost renomination to Barb Kniff McCulla.
District 53: David Maxwell lost renomination to fellow incumbent Dean Fisher in a redistricting race.
District 66: Lee Hein lost renomination to fellow incumbent Steve Bradley in a redistricting race.
District 87: Joe Mitchell lost renomination to fellow incumbent Jeff Shipley in a redistricting race.
District 88: Dustin Hite lost renomination to Helena Hayes.

In the general election 

 District 2: Democrat Steve Hansen lost to Republican Challenger Robert Henderson
 District 42: Republican Garrett Gobble lost in a rematch against Democratic Challenger Heather Matson, who he had unseated in the previous election.
 District 94: Democrat Phyllis Thede lost to Republican challenger Mike Vondran.
 District 99: Democrat Dennis Cohoon lost to Republican challenger Matthew Rinker.

Predictions

Results summary

References 

House of Representatives
Iowa House of Representatives
Iowa House of Representatives elections